Estadio IV Centenario is a multi-use stadium in Tarija, Bolivia. It is used mostly for football matches, on club level by Unión Central, Ciclón, and Real Tomayapo. The stadium has a capacity of 15,000 people.

IV Centenario
Tarija
Buildings and structures in Tarija Department